Cristina Salak (born August 10, 1976) is a Filipino volleyball coach and former volleyball player.

Career
She was part of the national team that won bronze medal in the 2005 SEA Games in the women's indoor volleyball. She also competed under the Philippine flag in the 2005 AVC Qualification for the 2006 FIVB Women's World Championship held at Ratchaburi, Thailand.

Salak became SVL Season 8, 2nd Conference champion with Philippine Army Lady Troopers, she was SVL Season 8, SEA Club Invitational Runner-Up, and SVL Season 9, 2nd Conference and Season 10 bronze medalist. She was again SVL Season 11, 2nd Conference champion before being silver medalist during the SVL Season 11, Reinforced Open, SVL Season 12, Open Conference and SVL Season 12, Reinforced Open.

For the 2013 PSL Invitational Conference she claimed again with the Philippine Army Lady Troopers the championship. Salak was named 2013 PSL Invitational Conference Best Blocker and championship playing with TMS-Philippine Army Lady Troopers and 2014 PSL All-Filipino Conference champion and Most Valuable player with Generika-Army Lady Troopers.

In 2015, she was named as one of the 18 chosen ladies for the tryouts held by the PVF. They will be a part of a national pool that will represent the Philippines for the 2015 SEA Games held in Singapore.

In June 2016, Salak announced her retirement as a player upon completing the 2016 season of the PSL. She played her final PSL game on December 8, 2016. She announced her intention to pursue a coaching career.

In February 2017, a new PSL team, COCOLIFE Asset Managers announced the appointment of Salak as its assistant coach. Salak briefly resumed playing during the 2017 and 2018 PSL Grand Prix conferences for COCOLIFE. Afterwards, Salak resumed her role as assistant coach for the team, renamed United VC, in 2019.

Salak briefly played for the Chery Tiggo 7 Pro Crossovers in the 2021 Premier Volleyball League Open Conference.

In July 2022, Salak was appointed the new head coach of the FEU Lady Tamaraws, her alma mater.

Clubs
  Philippine Army Lady Troopers (2005–2016)
  COCOLIFE Asset Managers (2017-2018)

Awards

Individual
 Shakey's V-League 9th, 2nd Conference "Best Setter"
 2013 PSL Invitational Conference "Best Blocker"
 2014 PSL All-Filipino Conference "Most Valuable Player"

Team
 SVL Season 8, 2nd Conference -  Champion, with Philippine Army Lady Troopers
 SVL Season 8, SEA Club Invitational -  Runner-Up, with Philippine Army Lady Troopers
 SVL Season 9, 2nd Conference –  Bronze medal, with Philippine Army Lady Troopers
 SVL Season 10, 2nd Conference –  Bronze medal, with Philippine Army Lady Troopers
 SVL Season 11, 2nd Conference -  Champion, with Philippine Army Lady Troopers
 SVL Season 11, Reinforced Open -  Runner-Up, with Philippine Army Lady Troopers
 SVL Season 12, Open Conference -  Runner-Up, with Philippine Army Lady Troopers
 SVL Season 12, Reinforced Open -  Runner-Up, with Philippine Army Lady Troopers
 2013 PSL Invitational Conference -  Champion, with TMS-Philippine Army Lady Troopers
 2013 PSL Grand Prix Conference -  Champion, with TMS-Philippine Army Lady Troopers 
 2014 PSL All-Filipino Conference -  Champion, with Generika-Army Lady Troopers

References

1976 births
Living people
University Athletic Association of the Philippines volleyball players
Sportspeople from Cavite
Far Eastern University alumni
Philippines women's international volleyball players
Filipino women's volleyball players
Setters (volleyball)
Southeast Asian Games bronze medalists for the Philippines
Southeast Asian Games medalists in volleyball
Competitors at the 2005 Southeast Asian Games
Filipino volleyball coaches